The Ellis-Griffith Baronetcy, of Llanidan in the County of Anglesey, was a title in the Baronetage of the United Kingdom. It was created on 26 January 1918 for the barrister and Liberal politician Ellis Ellis-Griffith. He was succeeded by his only surviving son, the second Baronet. On his early death in 1934 the title became extinct.

Ellis-Griffith baronets, of Llanidan (1918)
Sir Ellis Jones Ellis-Griffith, 1st Baronet (1860–1926)
Sir Elis Arundell Ellis-Griffith, 2nd Baronet (1896–1934)

References

Extinct baronetcies in the Baronetage of the United Kingdom